The 2006 Arab Women's Championship was the first edition of the Arab Women's Championship for national women's football teams affiliated with the Union of Arab Football Associations (UAFA). The tournament was hosted by Egypt between 19 and 29 April 2006. The winner was Algeria.

Participating teams
The 7 participated teams are:

Venues

Group stage

Group A

Group B

Knockout phase
The semi-final winners proceed to the final and those who lost compete in the third place playoff.

Semi-finals

Third place match

Final

Winners

Goalscorers
7 goals
 Nassima Abidi

6 goals
 Lilia Boumrar
 Dalila Zerrouki
 Dina Hadhraoui

Final ranking

References

External links
 1st Arab Women's Championship – UAFA official website
 1st Arab Women's Championship – kooora.com

2006
Arab
2005–06 in Egyptian football
2005–06 in Algerian football
2005–06 in Tunisian football
2005–06 in Moroccan football
2005–06 in Lebanese football
2006 in Palestinian football
2005–06 in Syrian football
2006